The ninth HMS Enterprise (A 71) of the Royal Navy was an  inshore survey ship built by M.W. Blackmore & Sons of Bideford and commissioned in 1959.

She was well-known around the harbours of Eastern England, and showed the flag on many official visits to Belgian, Dutch, and German ports on the North Sea coast, and as far up the Rhine as Cologne. After the American television series Star Trek became popular, Enterprise inevitably became known throughout the Navy as "the Starship." She was put up for disposal by sale in 1985.

 

Echo-class survey vessels (1957)
1959 ships